The Olympic Stadium is a multi-purpose stadium in Wrocław, Poland. It was built from 1926 to 1928 as Schlesierkampfbahn (Silesian Arena) according to a design by Richard Konwiarz, when the city of Wrocław (then Breslau) was still part of Germany. It is used mostly for American football—home of the Panthers Wrocław and speedway racing, it also serves as the home stadium of the motorcycle speedway team Sparta Wrocław.

The stadium has a capacity now of 11,000 people and was supposed to be one of the main pitches on UEFA Euro 2012. The newly constructed Stadion Miejski was used for that event instead.

History

The stadium was built as centre of a larger sports complex in the city district of Leerbeutel (now Zalesie), again extended from 1935 to 1939 and renamed Hermann–Göring–Stadion under the Nazi authorities. On 16 May 1937, it was the site of the legendary Breslau Eleven football match, when the Germany national football team defeated Denmark 8–0. Despite its current Polish name, the arena has never been an Olympic Games site (in particular, for the 1936 Summer Olympics); however the builder Richard Konwiarz achieved a bronze medal in the art competitions at the 1932 Summer Olympics in Los Angeles for his architectural design.

Heavily devastated during the Siege of Breslau in World War II, the stadium was rebuilt by the Polish municipal administration and named after General Karol Świerczewski. From the 1970s it was used by the Wrocław University School of Physical Education and comprehensively modernized with floodlights and an undersoil heating. The Wrocław city administration assumed ownership in 2006 and had the speedway racing track rebuilt, whereafter the smaller football pitch no longer meets the requirements of UEFA stadium categories.

Past events
The stadium has hosted the Speedway Grand Prix of Poland in 1995, 1996, 1997, 1999, and 2000. It also was a venue of the Speedway Grand Prix of Europe in 2004, 2005, 2006, and 2007. The stadium has hosted american football competition and motorcycle speedway competition at 2017 World Games.

Speedway World Finals

Individual World Championship
 1970 –  Ivan Mauger – 15pts
 1992 –  Gary Havelock – 14pts

World Pairs Championship
 1975 –  Sweden (Anders Michanek / Tommy Jansson) – 24pts

World Team Cup
 1961 –  Poland (Marian Kaiser / Henryk Żyto / Florian Kapała / Mieczysław Połukard / Stanislaw Tkocz) – 32pts
 1966 –  Poland (Andrzej Pogorzelski / Marian Rose / Antoni Woryna / Andrzej Wyglenda) – 41pts
 1971 –  Great Britain (Ray Wilson / Ivan Mauger / Jim Airey / Barry Briggs / Ronnie Moore)* – 37pts
 1977 –  England (Peter Collins / Michael Lee / Dave Jessup / John Davis / Malcolm Simmons) – 37pts
 1980 –  England (Michael Lee / Chris Morton / Peter Collins / Dave Jessup / John Davis) – 40pts
* The Great Britain Speedway Team contained riders from the Commonwealth nations until the early 1970s. Mauger, Briggs and Moore were from New Zealand, Airey from Australia and Wilson from England.

Speedway World Cup
 2001 –  Australia (Jason Crump / Leigh Adams / Ryan Sullivan / Todd Wiltshire / Craig Boyce) – 68pts
 2005 –  Poland (Tomasz Gollob / Piotr Protasiewicz / Jarosław Hampel / Rune Holta / Grzegorz Walasek) – 62pts

Speedway Grand Prix
 1995 Speedway Grand Prix of Poland –  – Tomasz Gollob
 1996 Speedway Grand Prix of Poland –  – Tommy Knudsen
 1997 Speedway Grand Prix of Poland –  – Greg Hancock
 1999 Speedway Grand Prix of Poland –  – Tomasz Gollob
 2004 Speedway Grand Prix of Europe –  – Bjarne Pedersen
 2005 Speedway Grand Prix of Europe –  – Tony Rickardsson
 2006 Speedway Grand Prix of Europe –  – Jason Crump
 2007 Speedway Grand Prix of Europe –  – Nicki Pedersen

National football team matches

See also
 Stadion Oporowska

References

Speedway venues in Poland
American football venues in Poland
Buildings and structures in Wrocław
Sport in Wrocław
Multi-purpose stadiums in Poland
Sports venues in Lower Silesian Voivodeship
Art Deco architecture in Poland
1928 establishments in Germany
Sports venues completed in 1928
European League of Football venues